Dimethyl maleate is an organic compound with the formula C6H8O4. It is the dimethyl ester of maleic acid.

Synthesis
Dimethyl maleate can be synthesized from maleic anhydride and methanol, with sulfuric acid acting as acid catalyst, via a nucleophilic acyl substitution for the monomethyl ester, followed by a Fischer esterification reaction for the dimethyl ester.

Applications
Dimethyl maleate is used in many organic syntheses as a dienophile for diene synthesis. It is used as an additive and intermediate for plastics, pigments, pharmaceuticals, and agricultural products. It is also an intermediate for the production of paints, adhesives, and copolymers.

Dimethyl maleate has also found use in applications where improvements in the hardness and toughness of polymer films are desired. This includes, in particular, the improvement of anti-blocking properties of copolymers of vinyl acetate with DMM. It is also used as an internal modifier to increase the glass transition temperature of styrene or vinyl chloride polymers.

Chemistry
Hydrolysis of dimethyl maleate gives maleic acid, or possibly the maleic acid monomethyl ester. Hydration of the same compound gives malic acid.

See also
 Dimethyl fumarate
 Diethyl maleate

References

Methyl esters
Maleate esters